Caloptilia acinata is a moth of the family Gracillariidae. It is known from India and Thailand.

References

acinata
Moths of Asia
Moths described in 1993